Jin Yuan (born 11 February 1988 in Shanghai) is a female Chinese long-distance runner who specializes in the 3000 metres steeplechase.

She finished ninth at the 2005 Asian Championships and at the 2006 World Junior Championships. She competed in at the 2007 World Championships without reaching the final. She represented her native country at the 2008 Summer Olympics.

Personal bests
800 metres - 2:07.74 min (2004)
1500 metres - 4:11.66 min (2006)
3000 metres - 9:07.18 min (2006)
5000 metres - 15:33.41 min (2009)
3000 metres steeplechase - 9:41.60 min (2008)

References

Team China 2008

1988 births
Living people
Athletes (track and field) at the 2008 Summer Olympics
Chinese female long-distance runners
Olympic athletes of China
Runners from Shanghai
Asian Games medalists in athletics (track and field)
Athletes (track and field) at the 2010 Asian Games
Chinese female steeplechase runners
Asian Games silver medalists for China
Medalists at the 2010 Asian Games
Universiade medalists in athletics (track and field)
Universiade silver medalists for China
Universiade bronze medalists for China